The Nordkette, also variously called the North Chain, Northern Range, rarely the Inn Valley Range or Inn Valley Chain (Inntalkette), is a range of mountains just north of the city of Innsbruck in Austria. It is the southernmost of the four great mountain chains in the Karwendel. To the west it is linked by the Erl Saddle to the Erlspitze Group, to the east via the  Stempeljoch saddle to the Gleirsch-Halltal Range. To the south it is bounded by the Inn valley. Its highest summit is the Kleiner Solstein in the west of the range.

The Nordkette is served by the Nordkette Cable Car, which offers easy access to the ski area and the Innsbruck Klettersteig. The latter starts in the east, near Hafelekar station on the Nordkette Cable Car, and runs via the Seegrubenspitze, the Kemacher and the Langen Sattel to Frau Hitt and the Frau Hitt Saddle in the west. In addition, the Goethe Way (Goetheweg) runs from Hafelekar Station along the arête eastwards to the Pfeis Hut north of the Rumer Spitze. Below the Hungerburg - Seegrube section of the Nordkette Cableway runs the Nordkette Singletrail, one of the most challenging routes in Europe for freeride mountain bikers.

The following Alpine Club huts in the area of the Nordkette offer climbers bases for multi-day tours taking in numerous summits: the Solsteinhaus, the Neue Magdeburger Hut, the Pfeis Hut and the Bettelwurf Hut (in the Gleirsch-Halltal Range).

Important summits 
The most important summits of the Nordkette from west to east are the:
 Großer Solstein
 Kleiner Solstein
 Hohe Warte
 Hintere Brandjochspitze
 Vordere Brandjochspitze
 Hippenspitze
 Brandjochkreuz
 Frau Hitt
 Westliche Sattelspitze
 Kemacher
 Kumpfkarspitze
 Seegrubenspitze
 Hafelekarspitze
 Gleirschspitze
 Mandlspitze
 Gleirschtaler Brandjoch
 Rumer Spitze
 Thaurer Jochspitze
 Pfeiser Spitze
 Lattenspitze
 Wildangerspitze
 Thaurer Zunterkopf
 Haller Zunterkopf
 Hochmahdkopf

External links 

 www.nordkette-austria.net – Website about the North Chain

Mountain ranges of the Alps
Two-thousanders of Austria
Mountain ranges of Tyrol (state)
Karwendel
Innsbruck